The 1974–75 WCHL season was the ninth season for the Western Canada Hockey League. Twelve teams completed a 70-game season.  The New Westminster Bruins won the President's Cup.

League notes
The Swift Current Broncos relocated to Lethbridge, Alberta to become the Lethbridge Broncos.
The WCHL season expanded to 70 games from 68.

Regular season

Final standings

Scoring leaders
Note: GP = Games played; G = Goals; A = Assists; Pts = Points; PIM = Penalties in minutes

1975 WCHL Playoffs

League quarter-finals
Saskatoon defeated Brandon 4 games to 1
Regina defeated Lethbridge 4 games to 2
New Westminster defeated Medicine Hat 4 games to 1
Victoria defeated Kamloops 4 games to 2

League semi-finals
Saskatoon defeated Regina 4 games to 1
New Westminster defeated Victoria 4 games to 2

WHL Championship
New Westminster defeated Saskatoon 4 games to 3

All-Star game

On January 15, the West All-Stars defeated the East All-Stars 4–1 at Victoria, British Columbia with a crowd of 3,452.

WHL awards

All-Star Team
Goaltender: Ed Staniowski, Regina Pats
Defenseman: Rick Lapointe, Victoria Cougars
Defenseman: Robin Sadler, Edmonton Oil Kings 
Centerman: Mel Bridgman, Victoria Cougars & Bryan Trottier, Lethbridge Broncos (tied)
Left Winger: Barry Dean, Medicine Hat Tigers
Right Winger: Don Murdoch, Medicine Hat Tigers

See also
1975 Memorial Cup
1975 NHL Entry Draft
1974 in sports
1975 in sports

References
whl.ca
 2005–06 WHL Guide

Western Hockey League seasons
WCHL